"God of Wonders" is a song written by Steve Hindalong and Marc Byrd, of the Christian rock group The Choir. The song was originally recorded by Mac Powell with Cliff and Danielle Young. It is the first track on the 2000 compilation album, City on a Hill: Songs of Worship and Praise. It has been recorded as a cover nearly 100 times  by notable artists including:
 Rebecca St. James on her 2002 album, Worship God.
 Kutless on their 2009 album, It Is Well.
 Shane & Shane.
 Steve Green.
 Caedmon's Call.
 Third Day on their 2003 album, Offerings II: All I Have to Give.

Reception
The song was nominated for best Worship Song of the year at the 2004 GMA Dove Awards. It was simultaneously number one on three of Christian radio's charts — adult contemporary (AC), inspirational, and Christian hit radio (CHR) — ordinarily three vastly different musical formats.

References

2000 songs